Greco Antonious Beda Banta Belgica (born March 27, 1978) is a Filipino politician who most recently served as chairman of the Presidential Anti-Corruption Commission (PACC) under the Duterte administration from March to October 2021.

Education 
He graduated from San Beda College with a Bachelor of Science degree in Marketing and Commerce, and earned his postgraduate degree in International Trade and Commerce at the University of California, Berkeley. He was also one of 42 graduates who completed the pilot class of the Executive Master of Arts in National Security Administration (E-MNSA) at the National Defense College of the Philippines.

Political career
He was elected as Councilor of the City of Manila in 2004 at the age of 26 and was nicknamed "Batang Magaling". He lost reelection in 2007.

Belgica ran as a candidate in the 2013 Philippine Senate election under the newly accredited Democratic Party of the Philippines, but failed to win a seat.

One of Belgica's campaign promises was a flat tax system for the Philippines; in particular, a simple, one-time, and one kind tax of not more than 10% only on net income on both individual and business profits. He also espouses belief in a limited and decentralized form of government, a free market, and Christian fundamentalism. He leads the campaign to convert the PDAF and other discretionary funds of politicians to tuition vouchers for all students and capital for families, individuals and businessmen. He believes that money and resources should be in the hands of people and not with politicians and government.

Belgica is the Founder of the Truth and Justice Coalition (TJC), a non-stock, non-profit non-government organization which envisions a progressive government where corruption is abhorred and public accountability prevails.

In the 2016 Senate election, he ran again for a senate seat as an independent candidate and supported Rodrigo Duterte for President. But again, he failed to win a seat.

On January 12, 2018, he was appointed  Commissioner of the Presidential Anti-Corruption Commission (PACC) under the Office of the President of the Philippines.

On October 30, 2018, he Founded the Pederalismo ng Dugong Dakilang Samahan (PDDS), a national political party accredited by the Commission on Elections (COMELEC)

He resigned from his post in the PACC to run again for a Senate seat in the 2022 election. He ran under PDDS but lost, finishing 37th.

Belgica v. Ochoa 
In 2013, nine petitions were filed before the Supreme Court of the Philippines regarding the constitutionality of the pork barrel system. One of these petitions were filed by Belgica and his group. The Supreme Court ruled in favor of the petitioners, with a unanimous vote of 14-0-1 abstain, and said that pork barrel system is unconstitutional.

In its landmark decision G.R. No. 208566 the Supreme Court defined that the pork barrel funds are lump sum discretionary funds appropriated in both the executive and legislative department. It further held, that there two kinds of pork barrel funds. The executive lump sum discretionary funds and the legislative lump sum discretionary fund known as the PDAF.

However, in his stint as commissioner of the Presidential Anti-Corruption Commission, Belgica stated that Janet Lim-Napoles, believed to have masterminded the PDAF Scam, is not really the 'mastermind', just 'willing beneficiary'.

Personal life 
He is the son of Presidential Adviser for Religious Affairs, Grepor "Butch" Belgica. His younger brother, Atty. Jeremiah B. Belgica, is Director-General of the Anti-Red Tape Authority.

An Elder at The Lord's Vineyard Covenant Community, a Taguig-based Full Gospel church where his father is a Senior Elder, he is president of Yeshua Change Agents, a non-government organization involved in anti-drug campaigns, and advocating societal reform along Biblical principles. 

A health and wellness buff, his sporting interests include basketball, swimming, and taekwondo.

He is also the founder of ReformPH Movement, and a member of the Fraternal Order of Eagles.

Filmography

Television
Bagong Pilipinas (People's Television Network) (2017)
Ireklamo Kay Greco (DZRH News Television) (2016–2019)
#GrecoLive (DZRJ-AM) (2016) with CJ Santos

References

External links
Senatorial campaign
Official Facebook page for Greco Belgica for Senator Movement

1978 births
Filipino Christian religious leaders
People from Manila
Living people
Lakas–CMD politicians
Democratic Party of the Philippines politicians
Manila City Council members
San Beda University alumni
Heads of government agencies of the Philippines
Duterte administration personnel